Missisa Lake is a lake in northeastern Kenora District in northwestern Ontario, Canada. It is in the James Bay drainage basin and is the source of the Missisa River, which begins at the southeast of the lake.

See also
List of lakes in Ontario

References

Other map sources:

Lakes of Kenora District